Sarah Elizabeth Quintrell (born in Lambeth, London) is an English writer and actress, best known for writing multi-award winning single drama Ellen (Channel 4, 2016) and the five part crime drama The Trial: A Murder In The Family (Channel 4, 2017). In 2017, she was named a BAFTA Breakthrough Brit. As an actor, Sarah has had an extensive career on stage as well as appearing in television such as Rillington Place (2016), Call the Midwife (2016) and Doctor Who.

Career 
Quintrell has had an extensive career on stage and was the original Bobbie in Mike Kenny's The Railway Children at York Theatre Royal. She transferred with the production to London Waterloo Station, where it won the Olivier Award for Best Entertainment (2011). She has also played Eliza Doolittle in Pygmalion (2005). Other theatre includes As You Like It, Forty Years On and an assortment of new writing including AgeSexLocation, Bloodtide and playing Natalie in James Phillips's City Stories, which had a residency in 15 at St James Theatre, London, (now The Other Palace). She transferred with the production to 59East59 Theater in New York as part of Brits Off Broadway (2016) and reprised the role at Crazy Coqs, Brasserie Zedel, London, in 2018.

Quintrell's writing debut, Ellen, was broadcast on Channel 4 in late 2016. Directed by Mahalia Belo and starring Jessica Barden, Yasmin Monet Prince, Jaime Winstone, Joe Dempsie and Charlie Creed-Miles. Ellen won the Broadcast Television Award Best Single Drama 2017, Writers' Guild Great Britain Best Short Form Drama 2017, BAFTA Cymru Feature/Television Film 2017 and the Prix Italia TV Drama 2017. Quintrell was nominated for the BAFTA Breakthrough Talent Award at the 2017 BAFTA Craft Awards.

The Trial: A Murder In The Family was broadcast in May 2017. Directed by Kath Mattock and Nick Holt, starring Michael Gould, Emma Lowndes and Laura Elphinstone. In 2018 it was nominated for Best Original Programme at the Broadcast Awards.

Sarah Quintrell started her career playing Sinéad in the BBC TV sitcom Carrie and Barry. She has gone on to appear in Rillington Place (BBC), Call the Midwife (BBC), Doctor Who (BBC), Lewis (ITV), The Watcher (UFA), The Last Trace (UFA), The Marchioness Disaster (Granada Yorkshire), Doctors (BBC) and Island at War (Granada).

Awards
 2017: Writers' Guild Great Britain for Best Short Form Drama - Ellen
 2017: BAFTA Television Craft Awards for Breakthrough Talent (nomination) - Ellen
 2017: Broadcast Television Award for Best Single Drama - Ellen
 2017: BAFTA Cymru Feature/Television Film - Ellen
 2017: Prix Italia TV Drama - Ellen
 2018: Broadcast Television Award for Best Original Programme - The Trial: A Murder in the Family (nomination)

Filmography

Television

References

External links

Living people
English television actresses
People from Lambeth
English stage actresses
Year of birth missing (living people)